Missile Me! is an album by the Japanese rock band Guitar Wolf. It was released in Japan in July 1995 and in the United States on 19 November 1996.

Critical reception

The A.V. Club called the album "28 corrosive minutes of sludgy, no-polish, roughed-up punk rock." Entertainment Weekly wrote that "these lo-fi speed freaks pulverize rockabilly, garage, and hardcore into a fuzzed-out raunch-fest that's as insistent as it is funny."

Track listing
 "Missile Me"
 "Hurricane Rock"
 "Kung Fu Ramone Culmination Tactic"
 "Can-Nana Fever"
 "Midnight Violence Rock’n Roll"
 "Link Wray Man"
 "Guitar Star"
 "Racing Rock"
 "Jet Rock’n Roll"
 "Devil Stomp"
 "Jet Blues"
 "Venus Drive"

References

Guitar Wolf albums
1995 albums